Southern Railway 107 is a steam locomotive built in November 1887 by Baldwin Locomotive Works for Southern Railway. It is a 2-8-0 consolidation of Southern's G class.

History
It first worked on the East Tennessee, Virginia & Georgia Railroad as their #419. In 1894, the ETV&G and the Richmond and Danville Railroad merged to create the Southern Railway and #419 was renumbered to 107. The locomotive continued service with the Southern until the Smoky Mountain Railroad purchased #107, retaining its number, in order to handle increased traffic during its "boom days", brought about by the construction of the TVA Douglas Dam Project on the French Broad River near Sevierville. The SMRR hauled materials to the construction site, and the contract netted huge sums of revenue for the road, leading to the only period of prosperity in its history. Unscrupulous managers, however, were more into lining their own pockets than in the welfare of the railroad. The 107 was purchased from a company owned by the Manager of the Smoky Mountain for $12,000.

The Consolidation served on through the steam era of the Smoky, taking a turn about with the line's other steamers. A washout on the line in January 1947, resulted in a "dead railroad" until May 17, 1947, when 107 rolled into town pulling a train of cars of foreign lines which had been stranded in Sevierville. On December 9th, 1954, the SMRR brought in a GE 44 ton diesel to replace the steam locomotives and #107 along with the other SMRR steamers were left on a siding to rust. In 1961, #107 was placed on display in Sevierville along with 2-6-0 #206 (Baldwin, 1910) to advertise the Rebel Railroad (later Dollywood).

References

Individual locomotives of the United States
2-8-0 locomotives
Steam locomotives of Southern Railway (U.S.)
Baldwin locomotives
Railway locomotives introduced in 1887
Standard gauge locomotives of the United States

Preserved steam locomotives of Tennessee